Calvigenia is a genus of air-breathing land snails in the subfamily Hadrinae of the family Camaenidae.

Species
Species within the genus Calvigenia include:
 Calvigenia blackmani (Cox, 1868)
 Calvigenia cognata (Gude, 1907)
 Calvigenia cootha Stanisic & Potter, 2010
 Calvigenia mucida (Pfeiffer, 1857)
 Calvigenia owengriffithsi Thach & F. Huber, 2020

References

External links
 Iredale, T. (1938). A basic list of the land Mollusca of Australia. Part III. The Australian Zoologist. 9: 83-124

Camaenidae